The Ngambri are an Aboriginal people of the Ngarigo nation who claim traditional ownership of the Australian Capital Territory area. The area includes the three plains, Ginninderry, Isabella, and Limestone, plus the mountainous areas further to the south.  They are represented by the Ngambri Local Aboriginal Land Council base in Queanbeyan.

When the settlers first moved into the region they reported there were three Aboriginal clans; the Yass mob (Ngunnawal), the Limestone Plains Blacks, and the Manaroo Mob (Ngarigo),  The Limestone Plain Blacks said the name of their clan was Nymuddy.

The extent of recognised Ngambri territory, and of their distinction from other Aboriginal families/ tribes, has been the subject of controversy. One reason for this is that Canberra, where Ngambri claims are made, lay close to the tribal boundaries that separated the Ngarigo from the Ngunawal who were from Yass.Many mixed race part Ngunawal people in the early1920s came down from Yass to Canberra to find work when thecapital city started to be built and labour was short.

Ngambri is also apparently an Aboriginal name for a location iis close to Black Mountain along Sullivans Creek down to the Yeelamgigee, now Molonglo River.

Language 
Research into the vocabularies collected in the 19th century by Mowle, Robinson, Eyre and Curr suggests the language spoken in the Canberra-Queanbeyan region to be a dialect, now called Nyamudy/Namadgi, of Ngarigu. The family groupings descending from speakers of this dialect included the Nammage, Nammitch, Yammoit and Ngemutch.

Traditional diet 

Murnong, now rare in the ACT due to land development, were a staple in the diet of traditional Ngambri people.
Ngambri people also ate grass trees, bulrushes, native raspberries, apple berries and native cherries.

For protein, the witchetty grub, Bogong moth, emu, koala, cod, platypus, echidna, brolga and bush turkey were all represented in the traditional Ngambri people's diet.

Locality 
When the first European explorers came to what they called the Limestone Plains, the local Aboriginal people (some 300) said they were of the Nyamuddy/Namadgi clan, and the area extending to the south was called Maneroo. The Ngambri family, of some 25-30 people, lived in the area of extending from the now Molonglo River to what is now Dickson, and incorporated the east of Black Mountain. The first part of the district settled by Europeans in 1825 was when Joshua John Moore took up land to the east of the Ngambri family as a sheep outstation of his Goulburn Plains pastoral property. Prior to visiting the location,he named his new property Camberry liking it to the River Cam in England,just as he named his Cabramatta Sydney property Horningsea after the village in Cambridgeshire England where he was born.. The creek which ran through the northern part of his land, he called Camberry Creek. The head rover and six convicts built slab huts where they lived with their Aboriginal wives and children. A short time later the land of the Ngambri family where the creek flowed into the River was acquired by the McPherson family  who built a homestead called Springbank on the high ground above the Molonglo River. John McPherson lived there with his wife Helen and their children, the first European family to live in what is now the Australian Capital Territory. One of their children was the first fully European person to be born on the Limestone Plains.  In 1886 the property was bought by the Sullivan family who sometime latter renamed the creek as Sullivans Creek rather than Canberry.

Aboriginal language 
The Aboriginal family who lived in the Ngambri location spoke a dialect called Nyamudy of the Ngarigo language.

Extension of the name to the whole Canberra region 
It has been claimed by some people claiming Ngambri descent that the name for Canberra is derived from the name of the "Ngambri" family rather than the name of the location. Hence they claim Canberra district is Ngambri territory. Others with more evidence, state the name Canberra came from Camberry, the name given to the first European settlement in the area, a sheep out-station, whose Cabramatta based owner, Joshua John Moore, came from Cambridge, England. The property had a head drover and six convicts who built slab huts and took Aboriginal wives with whom they had children. Moore sold it in 1843 to Arthur Jeffries who built Camberry Cottage. He did not live there and but rented out as Canberry Cottage to be the Rectory of the newly constructed St John's Church which was part of the Queanbeyan Parish. Later it became the Church of the Canberry Parish which gave its name to a wider area than the original area. After some time to make it sound more classical this was spelt 'Canberra' Parish.

Government recognition
In 2005, in response to a question in the ACT Legislative Assembly about the status of the Ngambri people, the Chief Minister at the time, Jon Stanhope stated that "Ngambri is the name of one of a number of family groups that make up the Ngunnawal nation." He went on to say that "the Government recognises members of the Ngunnawal nation as descendants of the original inhabitants of this region: There is no specific recognition of the Ngambri group outside of this broader acknowledgement." The reason for the recognition of the Ngunnnawal as the traditional first people was due to many European part-Ngunnwal people living in Yass, during the 1920-30s moved to Canberra to obtain work during the development of that city. As the majority were part Ngunnawal from Yass they chose the 'new tribe' name as Ngunnawal. The pursuit of land claims was unsuccessful, so this ‘new tribe’ dissolved and the tribal groups became independent again.

However in 2009, Chief Minister Jon Stanhope incorrectly said the Ngunnawal people were the traditional owners of Canberra after five signs on the Canberra border were defaced to include the Ngambri name. Stanhope at the time said that "one family that previously identified as Ngunnawal now identifies as Ngambri" and "this is causing confusion and distress within the community.".

As of 2022, the ACT government does not recognise Ngambri people as traditional owners of the ACT, but other groups do give acknowledgement such as the National Museum of Australia. The ABC however kept to the John Stanhope error and continually incorrectly states the ACT is Ngunnawal traditional country rather than Ngambri

Disputes

Disputes over the traditional ownership of Canberra and the surrounding region
The comprehensive dislocation of Aboriginal populations, intertribal marriage and interracial relationships following European settlement has led to a high proportion of people identifying themselves as Indigenous Australians not knowing their traditional origins. Australian Bureau of Statistics records showed several Aboriginal families in the ACT were affected by the removal of mixed race children from their parents in the Stolen Generation era. Due to the geographical relocation, and intertribal marriages since the 1900s, of indigenous populations there are disputes between people who claim descent from the Ngambri family of the Nyanmudy/Namadgi, Ngarigo and Ngunnawal people, who all claim they are Canberra's traditional owners. A family who originally claimed to be Ngunnawal changed their argument claiming to be from the Ngamri family. The debate came to a head in April 2009 when five "Welcome to Canberra" signs on the Canberra border were defaced by replacing the words "Ngunnawal Country" with "Ngambri Country". The signs were quickly restored by the ACT Government, with the Chief Minister Jon Stanhope promising that the signs would be monitored closely in the future. However this action exacerbated the problem, with the result that the Government funded research into Aboriginal family histories. The conclusion was there was insufficient genealogical evidence to conclusively state the Ngambri were the sole traditional owners of the ACT region, and they were possibly just a family group of the Nyamudy/Namedjii tribe.

In 1974 Norman Tindale in his major work on Aboriginal tribal boundaries located the southern boundary of Ngunawal country close to the ACT boundary. Like much of his mapping this was disputed by reference to much earlier evidence. Later research showed Tindall to be incorrect and the boundary was near Sutton on the Yass River. The unsettled dispute as to who were the first people of the Canberra district, is whether the Nyamudy/Namedjii were a separate tribe or part of the Ngarigo nation from the Monaro.

In December 2012, the Ngambri Local Aboriginal Land Council made three applications for native title:
 McQuoid Street, Queanbeyan, NSW;
 Karabar, Queanbeyan, NSW; and
 Erin Street, Queanbeyan, NSW.

For each application, the court determined that native title did not exist.

In 2013, an ACT Government genealogy report entitled Our Kin Our Country was released. The report, researched to settle the dispute of who were the first people, found that the Ngunnawall were not the original inhabitants of the ACT, however they did attend corroborees. The report concluded that evidence gathered from the mid-1800s onward was too scant to exclusively support any present day group's claims. It showed that the ACT land had been either part of the Ngarigo tribe territory, the Nyamudy territory, or split between the Nyamudy and Namadgi people. The question remains unanswered whether the Nyamudy/Namadgi tribe, the settler-named Limestone Blacks, occupied the whole Queanbeyan-Canberra-Namadgi area, or whether the Queanbeyan people were either part of the Ngarigo people of the Monaro.

In 2022, the Ngambri took the ACT government to the Supreme Court for recognition of their status as traditional owners.

Aboriginal Tent Embassy
In 2002, a group of Ngambri people burnt down a humpy and dismantled tents at the Aboriginal Tent Embassy.  At the time, prominent Ngambri elder Matilda House said her people were "cleaning up the site and making it respectable so that when visitors do come here we will be proud". House had been closely involved with the tent embassy since it was founded in 1972 and remembers the four men who founded the embassy as heroes. House had a vision for the future of the tent embassy:

Notable people 

 Onyong, leader of the Ngambri at the time of colonisation.
 Matilda House, prominent elder and activist.
 Shane Mortimer, a Ngambri-Guumaal elder and activist.

Notes

Citations

Sources

.

Further reading

External links

Aboriginal peoples of New South Wales
Indigenous Australians in the Australian Capital Territory
Canberra